William Evans (d. circa 1776) was a Welsh minister and lexicographer.

Life
Evans came from Cefn-gwilli, Llanedi in Carmarthen and was educated at Carmarthen College under Dr. Jenkins, 1767–72. He was for some years pastor of the Presbyterian congregation at Sherborne, but by March 1776 he had accepted a post at Moretonhampstead, Devon. He only spent seven weeks there, leaving on 12 May due to ill health., and probably died shortly after.

Works
His claim to noticeability is his English-Welsh dictionary, compiled while he was a student and published in 1771. A second edition appeared in 1812. The Welsh bibliographer Daniel Silvan Evans found some merit in it.

References

Year of birth missing
1776 deaths
Welsh lexicographers
18th-century lexicographers
Welsh Presbyterian ministers
Welsh-speaking clergy
18th-century Presbyterian ministers
18th-century Welsh writers
18th-century British male writers
18th-century Welsh people